Leucopogon cuspidatus is a species of flowering plant in the family Ericaceae and is endemic to the central Queensland coast. It is a shrub with densely hairy young branchlets, egg-shaped to lance-shaped leaves with the narrower end towards the base, and white, bell-shaped flowers that are bearded inside.

Description
The leaves point upwards and have a sharply-pointed tip.

Taxonomy
Leucopogon cuspidatus was first formally described in 1810 by Robert Brown in Prodromus Florae Novae Hollandiae et Insulae Van Diemen. The specific epithet (cuspidatus) means "cuspidate".

Distribution and habitat
This leucopogon grows in shrubland on hillsides and mountains on the central Queensland coast between Hook Island in the north and Great Keppel Island and Mount Wheeler in the south.

References

cuspidatus
Ericales of Australia
Flora of Queensland
Plants described in 1810
Taxa named by Robert Brown (botanist, born 1773)